Wolfegg is a municipality in the district of Ravensburg in Baden-Württemberg in Germany.

Overview
It is the site of Wolfegg Castle, the home of the Princes of Waldburg-Wolfegg, longtime owners of the only known copy of the Waldseemüller map. The map remained at the castle until 2001 when the Waldburg-Wolfegg family sold it to the U.S. Library of Congress.

Twin towns - sister cities
 Colico, Italy
 Rüthi, Switzerland

References

External links

Ravensburg (district)